Mandy Steele is an American politician serving as a member of the Pennsylvania House of Representatives for the 33rd district. Elected in November 2022, she was sworn in on January 3, 2023.

Early life and education 
Steele was born and raised in O'Hara Township, Allegheny County, Pennsylvania. She graduated from the University of Pittsburgh.

Career 
Steele is the founder of two non-profit organizations and served as a member of the Fox Chapel Borough Council for one term. She was elected to the Pennsylvania House of Representatives in November 2022.

References 

Living people
Pennsylvania Democrats
Women state legislators in Pennsylvania
People from Fox Chapel, Pennsylvania
University of Pittsburgh alumni
Year of birth missing (living people)
Democratic Party members of the Pennsylvania House of Representatives
Politicians from Allegheny County, Pennsylvania